Chevron U.S.A., Inc. v. Natural Resources Defense Council, Inc., 467 U.S. 837 (1984), was a landmark case in which the United States Supreme Court set forth the legal test for determining whether to grant deference to a government agency's interpretation of a statute which it administers. The decision articulated a doctrine now known as "Chevron deference". The doctrine consists of a two-part test applied by the court, when appropriate, that is highly deferential to government agencies: "whether the agency's answer is based on a permissible construction [emphasis added] of the statute", so long as Congress has not spoken directly to the precise issue at question.

The decision involved a lawsuit challenging the U.S. government's interpretation of the word "source" in an environmental statute. In 1977, the U.S. Congress passed a bill that amended the Clean Air Act of 1963the United States's comprehensive law regulating air pollution. The bill changed the law so that  all companies in the United States that planned to build or install any major source of air pollutants were required to go through an elaborate "new-source review" process before they could proceed. The bill did not precisely define what constituted a "source" of air pollutants, and so the Environmental Protection Agency (EPA) formulated a definition as part of implementing the changes to the law. The EPA's initial definition of a "source" of air pollutants covered essentially any significant change or addition to a plant or factory, but in 1981 it changed its definition to be simply a plant or factory in its entirety. This allowed companies to avoid the "new-source review" process entirely if, when increasing their plant's emissions through building or modifying, they simultaneously modified other parts of their plant to reduce emissions so that the overall change in the plant's emissions was zero. The Natural Resources Defense Council, an American non-profit environmental advocacy organization, then filed and ultimately lost a lawsuit challenging the legality of the EPA's new definition.

Chevron is one of the most important decisions in U.S. administrative law, and has been cited in thousands of cases since being issued in 1984.

Background
Under the Supreme Court's ruling in Marbury v. Madison, 5 U.S. (1 Cranch) 137 (1803), United States federal courts have the authority to judicially review the statutes enacted by Congress, and declare a statute invalid if it violates the Constitution. But the Constitution sets no express limits on how much federal authority can be delegated to a government agency. Rather, limits on the authority granted to a federal agency occur within the statutes enacted by Congress. It is also worth noting that federal courts are constitutionally of "limited jurisdiction". Congress bestowed on them the authority to adjudicate administrative matters in 1948. [28 USC sec. 1331 (1948)]

In 1974 the Supreme Court stated that deference depends on an administrative interpretation being consistent with the agency's other statements and being consistent with the congressional purpose:

Facts
Congress amended the Clean Air Act in 1977 to address states that had failed to attain the air quality standards established by the Environmental Protection Agency (EPA) (Defendant). "The amended Clean Air Act required these 'non-attainment' States to establish a permit program regulating 'new or modified major stationary sources' of air pollution." During the Carter administration, the EPA defined a source as any device in a manufacturing plant that produced pollution. In 1981, after Ronald Reagan's election, the EPA, which was headed by Anne M. Gorsuch, adopted a new definition that allowed an existing plant to get permits for new equipment that did not meet standards as long as the total emissions from the plant itself did not increase. The Natural Resources Defense Council (NRDC), an environmental protection group, challenged the EPA regulation in federal court, which ruled in the NRDC's favor.
Chevron, an affected party, appealed the lower court's decision.

Issue
The issue facing the Court was what standard of review should be applied by a court to a government agency's own reading of a statute that it is charged with administering.

Holding
The Court, in an opinion by Justice John Paul Stevens, upheld the EPA's interpretation. A two-part analysis was born from the Chevron decision (called the "Chevron two-step test"), where a reviewing court determines:

Importance

Chevron is probably the most frequently cited case in American administrative law, but some scholars suggest that the decision has had little impact on the Supreme Court's jurisprudence and merely clarified the Court's existing approach. The ruling that the judiciary should defer to a federal agency's interpretation of ambiguous language from Congressional legislation relevant to the agency is often referred to as the Chevron deference. Several of the EPA's rulings for emissions regulations, as well as the Federal Communications Commission's stance on net neutrality have been based on cases decided on the Chevron deference.

Chevron, 18 years later, was able to invoke Chevron deference to win another case, Chevron U.S.A., Inc. v. Echazabal, before the Supreme Court. In a unanimous decision, the Court applied Chevron deference and upheld as reasonable an Equal Employment Opportunity Commission regulation, which allowed an employer to refuse to hire an applicant when the applicant's disability on the job would pose a "direct threat" to the applicant's own health.

Three 21st-century decisions of the Supreme Court may limit the scope of administrative agency actions that receive Chevron deference to agency decisions that have the "force of law". This new doctrine is sometimes referred to as "Chevron step zero". Thus, for example, a regulation promulgated under the "notice and comment" provisions of § 553 of the Administrative Procedure Act would be likely to receive Chevron deference, but a letter sent by an agency, such as a US Securities and Exchange Commission (SEC) "no-action" letter, would not. However, an agency action that does not receive Chevron deference may still receive some degree of deference under the old standard of Skidmore v. Swift & Co., 323 U.S. 134 (1944). The majority in Christensen v. Harris County (2000) suggested that Chevron deference should apply to formal agency documents which have the force of law while Skidmore should apply to less formal agency documents in an attempt to draw a bright line for the question of "force of law" under Chevron step zero. In King v. Burwell (2015), the Supreme Court has suggested that Chevron deference may be inappropriate in regulatory actions of "deep economic and political significance", hinting at the possibility of substantially limiting, or even eliminating, the doctrine.

Opposition

Federal 
The United States House of Representatives in the 115th Congress passed a bill on January 11, 2017, called the "Regulatory Accountability Act of 2017", which, if made into law, would change the doctrine of Chevron deference. According to Charles Murray in By the People: Rebuilding Liberty Without Permission,

Chevron deference augments that characteristic of prerogative power by giving regulatory bureaucrats a pass available to no private citizen and to no other government officials — including the president and cabinet officers — who function outside the regulatory state. For everyone except officials of the regulatory state, judges do not defer to anything except the text of the law in question and the body of case law accompanying it.

Supreme Court Justice Neil Gorsuch (son of Anne Gorsuch, who was head of EPA at the time of the events which led to the Chevron decision) has also written opinions against Chevron deference, with news commentators believing that Gorsuch may rule against Chevron deference on the Supreme Court.

In the U.S. Supreme Court case City of Arlington, Tex. v. FCC, the dissent by Chief Justice Roberts joined by Justice Kennedy and Justice Alito objected to excessive Chevron deference to agencies:

My disagreement with the Court is fundamental. It is also easily expressed: A court should not defer to an agency until the court decides, on its own, that the agency is entitled to deference.

In Chevron U.S.A. Inc. v. Natural Resources Defense Council Inc., we established a test for reviewing "an agency's construction of the statute which it administers." 467 U.S. 837, 842, 104 S.Ct. 2778, 81 L.Ed.2d 694 (1984). If Congress has "directly spoken to the precise question at issue," we said, "that is the end of the matter." Ibid. A contrary agency interpretation must give way.

"It is emphatically the province and duty of the judicial department to say what the law is." Marbury v. Madison, 1 Cranch 137, 177, 2 L.Ed. 60 (1803). The rise of the modern administrative state has not changed that duty. Indeed, the Administrative Procedure Act, governing judicial review of most agency action, instructs reviewing courts to decide "all relevant questions of law." 5 U.S.C. § 706.

Likewise before joining the U.S. Supreme Court, 10th Circuit Judge Gorsuch in his concurrence in Gutierrez-Brizuela v. Lynch also objected to excessive Chevron deference to agencies:

Quite literally then, after this court declared the statutes' meaning and issued a final decision, an executive agency was permitted to (and did) tell us to reverse our decision like some sort of super court of appeals. If that doesn't qualify as an unconstitutional revision of a judicial declaration of the law by a political branch, I confess I begin to wonder whether we've forgotten what might.

In the Administrative Procedure Act (APA) Congress vested the courts with the power to "interpret ... statutory provisions" and overturn agency action inconsistent with those interpretations. 5 U.S.C. § 706.

For whatever the agency may be doing under Chevron, the problem remains that courts are not fulfilling their duty to interpret the law and declare invalid agency actions inconsistent with those interpretations in the cases and controversies that come before them. A duty expressly assigned to them by the APA and one often likely compelled by the Constitution itself. That's a problem for the judiciary. And it is a problem for the people whose liberties may now be impaired not by an independent decisionmaker seeking to declare the law's meaning as fairly as possible — the decisionmaker promised to them by law — but by an avowedly politicized administrative agent seeking to pursue whatever policy whim may rule the day.

Subsequently, in Waterkeeper Alliance v. EPA the court did not defer to the agency's interpretation.

State

Arizona
At the state level, Arizona has statutorily overturned Chevron deference with respect to most of its own agencies. In April 2018, the state's governor Doug Ducey signed HB 2238 into law, which states in relevant part,

In a proceeding brought by or against the regulated party, the court shall decide all questions of law, including the interpretation of a constitutional or statutory provision or a rule adopted by an agency, without deference to any previous determination that may have been made on the question by the agency.

The bill explicitly exempts health care appeals and actions of agencies created by the state's Corporation Commission.

Florida
In November 2018, voters in Florida approved an amendment to the Florida State Constitution, which states,

In interpreting a state statute or rule, a state court or an officer hearing an administrative action pursuant to general law may not defer to an administrative agency’s interpretation of such statute or rule, and must instead interpret such statute or rule de novo.

The amendment also stopped deference to agencies' interpretation of its own rules, ending Auer deference in the state.

Mississippi
The Mississippi Supreme Court judicially overturned Chevron deference at the state level in King v. Mississippi Military Department (2018).

North Carolina
The North Carolina Supreme Court has rejected Chevron deference, but the state agencies are still entitled to deference comparable to Skidmore deference. Nevertheless some lower courts have continued to give agencies deference under Chevron.

Ohio
The Ohio Supreme Court judicially overturned Chevron deference at the state level in TWISM Enterprises v. State Board of Registration in 2023.

Wisconsin
The Wisconsin Supreme Court judicially overturned Chevron deference at the state level in Tetra Tech, Inc. v. Wisconsin Department of Revenue (2016). In 2018, Governor Scott Walker signed a bill prohibiting courts from deferring to agency interpretations, and thus codifying the end to deference in Wisconsin.

See also
 List of United States Supreme Court cases, volume 467
 United States v. Mead Corp. (2001) – more recent case addressing the limits of Chevron deference and the deference to be afforded to informal rule making
 West Virginia v. EPA (2022) - a ruling that codifies the major questions doctrine, a legal theory that partially invalidates the Chevron deference

Further reading

 Wiseman, A., & Wright, J. (2020). "Chevron, State Farm, and the Impact of Judicial Doctrine on Bureaucratic Policymaking." Perspectives on Politics.

References

External links

United States Supreme Court cases
United States administrative case law
United States statutory interpretation case law
Chevron Corporation
1984 in the environment
1984 in United States case law
Natural Resources Defense Council
United States Supreme Court cases of the Burger Court